Rune Gulliksen (born January 23, 1963) is a former Norwegian ice hockey player. He was born in Fredrikstad, Norway. He played for the Norwegian national ice hockey team at the 1988 and 1992 Winter Olympics.

References

1963 births
Living people
Ice hockey players at the 1988 Winter Olympics
Ice hockey players at the 1992 Winter Olympics
Norwegian ice hockey players
Olympic ice hockey players of Norway
Sportspeople from Fredrikstad
Stjernen Hockey players
Storhamar Dragons players
Trondheim Black Panthers players